The canton of Fiumorbo-Castello is an administrative division of the Haute-Corse department, southeastern France. It was created at the French canton reorganisation which came into effect in March 2015. Its seat is in Prunelli-di-Fiumorbo.

It consists of the following communes:
 
Chisa
Ghisoni
Isolaccio-di-Fiumorbo
Lugo-di-Nazza
Noceta
Pietroso
Poggio-di-Nazza
Prunelli-di-Fiumorbo
Rospigliani
San-Gavino-di-Fiumorbo
Serra-di-Fiumorbo
Solaro
Ventiseri
Vezzani

References

Cantons of Haute-Corse